A Day in New York is a 2003 studio album by the trio Morelenbaum²/Sakamoto, consisting of Jaques Morelenbaum, Paula Morelenbaum, and Ryuichi Sakamoto. The album was recorded live in the studio and featured songs they had been performing together on the 2002 tour for their previous album, Casa, a tribute to Antônio Carlos Jobim.

Track listing

Personnel
Ryuichi Sakamoto – piano
Jaques Morelenbaum – cello
Paula Morelenbaum – vocals
Luiz Brasil – guitar
Marcelo Costa – drums, percussions

References

2003 albums
Ryuichi Sakamoto albums